Adolfo Daniel Vallejo (born 28 April 2004) is a Paraguayan tennis  player who was the world number 1 of the ITF  youth in 2022

Vallejo has a career high ATP singles ranking of 743 as of January 2023. 

On the junior tour, Vallejo has achieved a career high junior ranking of 2, achieved in March 2022. This result came after a series of favorable results during the 2021 and 2022 season.

2021 - 2022 season 
Beginning with his historical performance at the Junior Orange Bowl 2021 in Plantation, Florida, where he beat former junior world number 2, Bruno Kuzuhara to take the crown at this prestigious event. He is the first Paraguayan to achieve this and only the second to reach the final (the first being Victor Pecci).

Davis Cup 
Vallejo represents Paraguay at the Davis Cup, where he has a win–loss record of 2–1.

Junior Grand Slam finals

Doubles: 1 (1 runners-up)

ATP Challenger and ITF Futures finals

Singles: 1 (0–1)

Doubles: 5 (4–1)

References

External links
 
 
 

2004 births
Living people
Paraguayan male tennis players
21st-century Paraguayan people